Goldman Sachs Tower can refer to the following two buildings in the New York metropolitan area, both housing Goldman Sachs offices:

 30 Hudson Street, in Jersey City
 200 West Street, in Manhattan